Koduku Kodalu is a 1972 Telugu-language drama film, produced by V. Venkateswarlu under the Padmasri Pictures banner and directed by P. Pullaiah. It stars Akkineni Nageswara Rao and Vanisri, with music composed by K. V. Mahadevan.

Plot
The film begins with Raja Shekar a young & energetic guy who loves a charming girl Shobha, the daughter of a millionaire Srihari Rao. During the time of their engagement, Srihari Rao's sister Durgamma denounces Shekar's mother Janakamma as a woman of ill repute. Knowing it, Srihari Rao necks them out when Janakamma also claims it true, distressed Shekar leaves the house accusing his mother. After some time, wanderer Shekar is presented in the court for a petty case where the Judge, Raghava Rao recognizes Shekar as his son, so, he acquits and takes him home without revealing his identity. Meanwhile, Srihari Rao compels Shobha to the alliance. So, she absconds and reaches her cousin Geeta a nurse who, fortunately, serves Raghava Rao. Afterward, Shekar also learns the truth when he puts Raghava Rao down for deceiving his mother but later he realizes his virtue. Right now, both of them move for Janakamma but her whereabouts are not known, so, they proceed toward Srihari Rao and prove Janakamma's chastity. At present, Raghava Rao wants to perform the marriage of Geeta & Shekar and for his father's happiness, he too agrees.

Parallelly, Janakamma joins as a maid in the house of a wealthy woman Vasundhara, and her vicious husband Jaganatham, displays as insane. Indeed, she is scared of her husband as it is well known that he is going to kill her for the property. Moreover, Jaganatham ploys, by posing as if he is having a twin brother Satyanandam and plans to marry Shobha in that attire. Thereafter, Jaganatham intrigues that he went on a pilgrimage, slaughters Vasundhara, indicts Janakamma, and returns as Satyanandam. At this juncture, the case goes into sessions when Raghava Rao witnesses Janakamma, becomes perturbed and informs Shekar. Now, Shekar decides to affirm the truth for which he chases Jaganatham / Satyanandam. On the other side, Shobha discovers Geetha's love for Shekar, so, she departs and fortuitously lands at Satyanandam's house. Eventually, being aware of reality Geeta sacrifices her love. At last, Shekar with the help of Shobha in disguise sees the end of Satyanandam and makes him arrested. Finally, the movie ends on a happy note with the marriage of Shekar & Shobha.

Cast
Akkineni Nageswara Rao as Raja Shekar 
Vanisri as Shobha 
Lakshmi as Geetha 
S. V. Ranga Rao as Justice Raghava Rao 
Gummadi as Srihari Rao 
Jaggayya as Doctor 
Ramana Reddy as Hindi Master 
Satyanarayana as Jaganatham / Satyanandam
Rajababu as Bujji
Santha Kumari as Janakamma
Suryakantham as Durgamma 
Ramaprabha as Rama
P. R. Varalakshmi as Vasundhara 
Nirmalamma as Rangamma

Crew
Art: S. Krishna Rao
Choreography: K. Thangappan
Lyrics - Dialogues: Acharya Aatreya
Playback: Ghantasala, P. Susheela, S. Janaki, L. R. Eswari
Music: K. V. Mahadevan
Cinematography: K. S. Prasad
Editing: N. M. Shankar
Producer: V. Venkateswarlu
Screenplay - Director: P. Pullaiah
Banner: Padmasri Pictures
Release Date: 22 December 1972

Soundtrack

Music composed by Chakravarthy. Lyrics were written by Acharya Aatreya. Music released on EMI Columbia Audio Company.

References

Indian drama films
Films scored by K. V. Mahadevan